Brick House, also known as Garland House or King David's Palace, is a historic home located in the village of Clifford (formerly, New Glasgow), Amherst County, Virginia.  It is a two-story Federal Style, Flemish bond brick house with a projecting pavilion.  It was built about 1803 by David Shepherd Garland, later a U.S. Congressman, and measures 65 feet by 44 feet.  Two additions were made during the nineteenth century; the first, about 1830, behind the east parlor and the second, about 1850, was adjacent to the dining room and the first addition.

It was listed on the National Register of Historic Places in 2006. It is located in the Clifford-New Glasgow Historic District.

References

External links
Brick House, State Route 151, Clifford, Amherst County, VA: 2 photos and 2 data pages at Historic American Buildings Survey

Houses in Amherst County, Virginia
Houses completed in 1803
Federal architecture in Virginia
Houses on the National Register of Historic Places in Virginia
National Register of Historic Places in Amherst County, Virginia
Individually listed contributing properties to historic districts on the National Register in Virginia